Sir Eric St John Bamford, KCB, KBE, CMG (14 October 1891 – 13 April 1957) was an English civil servant.

Background and career 
Born on 14 October 1891, Bamford attended Corpus Christi College, Oxford, before passing the examinations to enter HM Civil Service in 1914. Service in the First World War interrupted his entry; he was wounded in France which left him in worsening health for the rest of his life. After demobilisation, he entered the Civil Service as an official in HM Treasury in 1919.

Bamford was private secretary to the Financial Secretary to the Treasury from 1919 until 1921. He was then Secretary to the Trade Facilities Advisory Committee from 1926 to 1933, and then to the Imperial Communications Advisory Committee until 1938, when he returned to the Treasury. When the Second World War broke out in 1939, he moved to the new Ministry of Information; he was appointed Deputy Director-General in 1941 and Director-General in 1945. He was then Director-General of the Central Office of Information (the Ministry of Information's successor) in 1946, before returning to the Treasury, where he remained for two years. Finally, he was Chairman of the Board of Inland Revenue from 1948 to 1955. He died on 13 April 1957. Alongside two knighthoods (the KCB and KBE awarded in 1949 and 1946 respectively) and the CMG, he was awarded with an honorary fellowship by his old college.

References 

1891 births
1957 deaths
English civil servants
Alumni of Corpus Christi College, Oxford
Knights Companion of the Order of the Bath
Knights Commander of the Order of the British Empire
Companions of the Order of St Michael and St George